Barbodes disa is an extinct species of cyprinid fish formerly endemic to Lake Lanao in Mindanao, the Philippines.  This species reached a length of  TL.

References

disa
Cyprinid fish of Asia
Freshwater fish of the Philippines
Endemic fauna of the Philippines
Fauna of Mindanao
Taxa named by Albert William Herre
Fish described in 1932